"Heavyweight Champion of the World" is the debut single of English band Reverend and the Makers as well as the first single from their debut album, The State of Things (2007). The single was released on 6 May 2007 on download only and was subsequently released on CD and 7-inch vinyl on 28 May that year. The single was also released on a white label which was limited to 800 copies; the track list for this release is the same as the standard vinyl. The song peaked at number eight on the UK Singles Chart and number 85 on the Australian ARIA Singles Chart. It was certified gold by the British Phonographic Industry in 2022 for sales and streams exceeding 400,000 units.

Inspiration

"Heavyweight Champion Of The World" tells a story of not just under-achievers, but the majority who are trapped within repetitive lives, with the ironic hook "just be like everybody else". Many songs by the band centre on the downward spiral of somebody's life. The song title is taken from a line of Barry Hines book A Kestrel for a Knave. Like the song, the book's main character is an under-achieving young boy growing up in Yorkshire. The song has received rave reviews, and appeared as Zane Lowe's 'Hottest Record In The World Today', and is equally liked by Radio 1 DJs Nick Grimshaw and Greg James. The single is accredited to Jon McClure, Ed Cosens and Alan Smyth, acknowledging the work that Smyth did towards the demo of the song.

In addition to the reference to Barry Hines, the song's chorus includes another pugilistic reference, from the movie On the Waterfront. The line, "I coulda been a contender. I coulda been somebody" spoken by Marlon Brando in the movie is closely paraphrased in the song's lyrics as "I could've been a contender/Could've been a someone."

Track listings

UK 7-inch single 
A1. "Heavyweight Champion of the World"
B1. "18-30"
B2. "The Last Resort" (with John Cooper Clarke)

UK CD single 
 "Heavyweight Champion of the World"
 "18-30" (extended)
 "Heavyweight Champion of the World" (club mix)

Australian maxi-CD single 
 "Heavyweight Champion of the World"
 "18-30"
 "Heavyweight Champion of the World" (club)
 "Heavyweight Champion of the World" (dub)
 "The Last Resort" (with John Cooper Clarke)

Charts

Weekly charts

Year-end charts

Certifications

References

2007 debut singles
2007 songs
PIAS Recordings singles
Reverend and The Makers songs
Songs written by Alan Smyth
Wall of Sound (record label) singles